The women's 200 metres event at the 1993 Summer Universiade was held at the UB Stadium in Buffalo, United States with the final on 17 July 1993.

Medalists

Results

Heats

Semifinals

Final

Wind: +3.2 m/s

References

Athletics at the 1993 Summer Universiade
1993 in women's athletics
1993